Bodianus loxozonus, the blackfin hogfish, is a species of wrasse. It is found in the Western Pacific Ocean.

Size

References

loxozonus
Fish of the Pacific Ocean

Taxa named by John Otterbein Snyder
Fish described in 1908